Otting is a municipality  in the district of Donau-Ries in Bavaria in Germany. 

The village is located between Augsburg and Nuremberg, about 5 km east of Wemding and about 6 km west of Monheim.

Mayors
Rupert Felber, 1945–1946 (CSU),
Kaspar Waidhaußer, 1946–1952 (CSU),
Kaspar Rupp, 1952–1956 (CSU),
Karl Häfelein, 1956–1984 (CSU),
Wolfgang Seefried, 1984–1990 (Free voters),
Walter Bayerle, 1990–2002 (Free voters),
Johann Bernreuther, 2002–2020
Wolfgang Lechner, since 2020

Further reading 
Gemeinde Otting: Otting im Spiegel seiner Geschichte. Reimlingen 2009.

External links
 
 Official website

References

Donau-Ries